The Trinidadian funnel-eared bat (Natalus tumidirostris) is a species of bat in the family Natalidae. It is endemic to Colombia, Venezuela, Guyana, Suriname, French Guiana, Trinidad and Tobago and Netherlands Antilles.

References

Natalus
Bats of the Caribbean
Bats of South America
Mammals of Colombia
Mammals of Trinidad and Tobago
Mammals of the Bahamas
Taxonomy articles created by Polbot
Mammals described in 1900
Taxa named by Gerrit Smith Miller Jr.